National Paralympic Committee Germany (ger. Deutsche Behindertensportverband e.V. (DBS)) is responsible for Germany's participation in the Paralympic Games.

The DBS represents rehabilitation sports, popular sports, and professional sports.

Football 5-a-side
To raise awareness, players from Bundesliga club FC Bayern Munich along with players from the Football 5-a-side national team and students from the St. Anna Gymnasiums in Augsburg participated in a promotional training session.

See also
Germany at the Paralympics
German Olympic Sports Confederation

References

External links 
 
 Team Deutschland Paralympics

Germ
Germany at the Paralympics
Paralympic Committee
Disability organisations based in Germany